Vuka is a municipality in Osijek-Baranja County, Croatia. In the 2011 Croatian census there were 1,200 inhabitants, 97.17% of which were Croats.

Famous people
Katarina Matanović-Kulenović - first female Croatian pilot and parachutist
Milko Cepelić - Croatian priest, historian and ethnographer

References

External links
Vuka municipality

Municipalities of Croatia
Populated places in Osijek-Baranja County